Lomas Ridge is a ridge,  long, trending north-northwest–south-southeast, midway between Jefford Point and Tortoise Hill, in southeastern James Ross Island, Antarctica. It was named by the UK Antarctic Place-Names Committee in 1995 after Simon Andrew Lomas (born 1965), a British Antarctic Survey (BAS) geologist who was a member of the BAS field party in the area, 1994–95.

References

Ridges of Graham Land
Landforms of James Ross Island